U-139 may refer to one of the following German submarines:

 , the lead ship of the Type U 139 submarines; launched in 1917 and that served in the First World War until surrendered on 24 November 1918; became French submarine Halbronn until 24 July 1935; broken up
 During the First World War, Germany also had this submarine with a similar name:
 , a Type UB III submarine laid down but unfinished at the end of the war; broken up on the slip in 1919
 , a Type IID submarine that served in the Second World War until scuttled on 2 May 1945; wreck broken up at later date

Submarines of Germany